The mixed Nacra 17 was a sailing event on the Sailing at the 2020 Summer Olympics program in Tokyo that took place between 28 July–3 August at Kamakura. 13 races (the last one a medal race) were held.

The medals were presented by IOC Member Giovanni Malagò and World Sailing Athlete Commission Chair Jo Aleh (NZL).

Schedule

Results

References 

Mixed Nacra 17
Mixed events at the 2020 Summer Olympics
Mixed-sex sailing at the Summer Olympics